Michael of Canterbury (fl. 1275 – 1321) was an English gothic architect responsible for work at Canterbury Cathedral and St Stephen's Chapel, at the Palace of Westminster. He also designed the Cheapside Eleanor Cross.

Harvey (1950) credits Master Michael with the innovation of using the ogee arch in gothic architecture, having a wide influence on French Flamboyant gothic and English Perpendicular.

References

13th-century English architects
14th-century English architects
Gothic architects
Architects from Kent